Remember Me is a 1979 American short documentary film produced by Dick Young, that was filmed in the US, the Middle East and Asia. It was nominated for an Academy Award for Best Documentary Short.

Summary
Documenting and contrasting children's youthful beauty with the squalor, hardship and wasted potential of their daily lives; students learning how their counterparts really live and are encouraged to think about what these children need to thrive.

References

External links

1979 films
1979 documentary films
1979 short films
1970s short documentary films
American short documentary films
1970s English-language films
1970s American films